Green Lantern: Willworld is an original graphic novel written by J. M. DeMatteis and illustrated by Seth Fisher released by DC Comics in hardcover in July 2001.

Publication history
The artist Seth Fisher notes that: 

Fisher has also said that "we wanted a book where I could squeeze my imagination for everything it was worth and 'Green Lantern' just seemed to have the most potential that way".

Writer J. M. DeMatteis described the story as "Green Lantern meets Little Nemo in Quantum Wonderland. A playful, surreal, quantum physics fairytale".

The book was released as a hardcover in July 2001 and softcover in December 2003.

Plot
This story tells how a young Hal Jordan mastered his power ring. The story is set on a world formed entirely by the imagination of other Green Lanterns.

Critical reception
Locus Magazine gave the book a positive review and noted that it was "stunning stuff, highly recommended".

References

External links

2001 books
2001 comics debuts
Comics by J. M. DeMatteis
DC Comics graphic novels
Willworld
Superhero comics